The 2015–16 Davidson Wildcats men's basketball team representsed Davidson College during the 2015–16 NCAA Division I men's basketball season. The Wildcats, led by 27th year head coach Bob McKillop, played their home games at the John M. Belk Arena and were second year members of the Atlantic 10 Conference. Davidson finished the season with a record of 20–13, 10–8 record in A-10 play, finishing in sixth place. They lost to eventual tournament champion, Saint Joseph's, in the semifinals of the A-10 tournament. They received an invitation to the National Invitation Tournament where they lost in the first round to Florida State.

Previous season 
The Wildcats finished the 2014–15 season 24–8, 14–4 in A-10 play to win the regular season championship. They advanced to the semifinals of the A-10 tournament where they lost to VCU. They received an at-large bid to the NCAA tournament where they lost in the second round to Iowa.

Departures

Incoming Transfers

Incoming recruits

Roster 

}
}

Schedule

|-
!colspan=9 style=| Exhibition

|-
!colspan=9 style=| Non-conference regular season

|-
!colspan=9 style=| Atlantic 10 regular season

|-
!colspan=9 style=| Atlantic 10 tournament

|-
!colspan=9 style=| NIT

See also
2015–16 Davidson Wildcats women's basketball team

References

Davidson Wildcats men's basketball seasons
Davidson
Davidson
2016 in sports in North Carolina
2015 in sports in North Carolina